Cerise may refer to:

 The French word for cherry, a fruit
 Cerise (color), a deep to vivid pinkish red 
 Cerisé, a French commune
 Cerise (satellite)
 Cerise (comics), a fictional character from Marvel Comics
 Professor Cerise, a character in the Pokémon anime